Elon (אֵילוֹן in Hebrew) is a masculine first name, or Jewish surname, which means "oak tree" in the Hebrew language. Variants of the name include Alon, Eilan, Eilon, and Elan; it can also be a variant spelling of Ilan and Ilon, of the similar meaning "tree".

The given name became more popular in the 2010s (from #3,310 in 2008 to No. 885 in 2018 for baby boys in the United States) due to the rise to fame of entrepreneur Elon Musk, though he is not Jewish.

Given name

Elon (Judges), biblical leader of the Israelites in the Book of Judges
Elon R. Brown (1857–1922), American politician
Elon Howard Eaton (1866–1934), American ornithologist
Elon J. Farnsworth (1837–1863), American general
Elon Farnsworth (1799–1877), American lawyer and politician
Elon Galusha (1790–1856), American preacher
Elon Ganor (born 1950), Israeli businessman
Elon Gasper (born 1951), American computer scientist
Elon Gold (born 1970), American comedian and actor
Elon Hogsett (1903–2001), American baseball player
Elon Huntington Hooker (1869–1938), American businessman
Elon Jones (born 1960), Barbadian cricketer
Elon Lages Lima (1929–2017), Brazilian mathematician
Elon Lindenstrauss (born 1970), Israeli mathematician
Elon Musk (born 1971), business magnate
Elon James White (born 1978), American journalist
Eilon Solan (born 1969), Israeli mathematician and sci-fi writer
Eilona Ariel (born 1958), Israeli filmmaker

Surname
Amos Elon (1926–2009), Israeli writer
Ari Elon (born 1950), Israeli writer
Binyamin Elon (1954–2017), Israeli politician
Danae Elon (born 1970), Israeli documentary filmmaker
Emuna Elon (born 1955), Israeli writer
Menachem Elon (1923–2013), Israeli judge
Mordechai Elon (born 1959), Israeli rabbi
Ori Elon (born 1981), Israeli writer
Naomi Eilan, British philosopher
Ya'akov Eilon (born 1961), Israeli television presenter and journalist

Characters
Elon Muskox, a mosaiculture horticultural living sculpture at City Hall in Yellowknife, NWT, Canada

See also 
Alon (name)
Ilan (name)

References

Hebrew-language given names
Hebrew-language surnames
Modern names of Hebrew origin
Hebrew masculine given names
English masculine given names